Fail on Cue is the fourth major label studio album released in 2008 by Jimmie's Chicken Shack.

Track listing
 17 - 2:39
 Caught Down - 3:03
 Mutha Luvas - 3:41
 Friendly Fire - 3:29
 The Quiet Ones - 3:27
 Another Great Idea - 3:12
 Good at It - 2:56
 Making Babies - 3:29
 Waiting Room - 3:09
 Radio Song - 4:08

Personnel
Jimi Haha - Guitar, Vocals
Matt Jones - Guitar, Backing Vocals
Christian Valiente - Bass, Backing Vocals
Jerome Maffeo - Drums, Percussion, Backing Vocals

2008 albums
Jimmie's Chicken Shack albums